The large scimitar babbler (Erythrogenys hypoleucos) is a species of bird in the family Timaliidae.
It is found in Bangladesh, Cambodia, China, India, Laos, Malaysia, Myanmar, Thailand, and Vietnam.
Its natural habitats are subtropical or tropical moist lowland forest and subtropical or tropical moist montane forest.

References

Collar, N. J. & Robson, C. 2007. Family Timaliidae (Babblers)  pp. 70 – 291 in; del Hoyo, J., Elliott, A. & Christie, D.A. eds. Handbook of the Birds of the World, Vol. 12. Picathartes to Tits and Chickadees. Lynx Edicions, Barcelona.

large scimitar babbler
Birds of Northeast India
Birds of Southeast Asia
large scimitar babbler
large scimitar babbler
Taxonomy articles created by Polbot